Arsul Sani is an Indonesian politician and currently secretary-general of the United Development Party. He's also a member of the People's Representative Council, sitting on the legislature's Commission III specializing in legal affairs.

Via his seat on the legislature's Commission III, Sani was involved in attempts to ban black magic, a move which had proven difficult since the 1990s because banning it would require the government to acknowledge that it exists. Sani also commented on the controversy surrounding the November 2016 Jakarta protests, questioning why police had financially investigated some of the protests' backers but not the financial backers of Jakarta governor Basuki Tjahaja Purnama.

References

Indonesian Muslims
Living people
United Development Party politicians
1964 births
People from Pekalongan
Members of the People's Representative Council, 2014
Members of the People's Representative Council, 2019